Zorry Kid is the title character of an Italian comic series created by Benito Jacovitti.

The comics debuted in 1968, published in the children magazine Il Corriere dei Piccoli; it was later published by the comic magazine Il Giornalino until 1990.

A series of animation shorts was realized in 1969 for Carosello.

The comic consists of a surreal and zany parody of Zorro.

Several anthological books and collections were published over the years.

References 

Italian comics titles
Italian comics
Italian comics characters
Comics characters introduced in 1968
1968 comics debuts
1990 comics endings
Fictional swordfighters in comics
Parody comics
Parodies of comics
Parodies of literature
Parodies of television shows
Humor comics
Comics adapted into television series
Comics adapted into animated series
Male characters in comics
Comics set in Mexico
Zorro